Torii Kiyohiro (d. ) was a Japanese artist of the Torii school of ukiyo-e.

Kiyohiro's date of birth is unknown, while Ukiyo-e Ruikō lists his death date as 1776. No other evidence of those dates are known.

Kiyohiro's personal name was Shichinosuke.  He lived in the Sakaimachi area of Edo (modern Tokyo) and was registered as a student of Torii Kiyomasu I and likely studied under Torii Kiyonobu II or Torii Kiyomasu II. Ernest Fenollosa considered him "of almost equal ability with" his contemporary Torii Kiyomitsu, and speculated they may have been brothers.

Kiyohiro's first known work appeared about 1751, and the last about 1764. All of his known works are benizuri-e, and though the Torii school was known for its yakusha-e actor prints, Kiyohiro also specialized in bijin-ga prints of female beauties extending into some with erotic themes. He specialized in designing prints in the ōban size.



Footnotes

Notes

References

Works cited

Further reading

External links
 
 Torii Kiyohiro at ukiyo-e.org
 Torii Kiyohiro at Cultural Heritage Online, the Agency for Cultural Affairs, Japan.(Japanese)

1776 deaths
Torii school
Ukiyo-e artists
Year of birth unknown